Christophe Léonard (born 3 January 1990) is a French professional basketball player, who is currently playing for Poitiers Basket 86 in the French LNB Pro B. A native of Schœlcher on Martinique, Leonard is  and weighs .

Professional career
Léonard was the French 2nd Division Finals MVP, and the French 2nd Cup MVP in 2016.

National team career
Léonard was a part of the junior French national team that finished in place 8th at the 2009 FIBA Under-19 World Cup.

External links
Team Site Profile

1990 births
Living people
Cholet Basket players
French men's basketball players
French people of Martiniquais descent
HTV Basket players
JL Bourg-en-Bresse players
Martiniquais men's basketball players
People from Schœlcher
Poitiers Basket 86 players
Small forwards
STB Le Havre players